Ulrich II (died 9 December 1076) was abbot of the Abbey of Saint Gall from 1072 to 1076.

Life 
Abbot Nortpert appointed the provost Ulrich as his successor when he abdicated in 1072. Nothing is known about Ulrich's life before his inauguration as abbot.

Notes and references

External links 
 Ulrich on the website of the Stiftsarchiv St. Gallen

Abbots of Saint Gall

1076 deaths
Year of birth unknown